Gasson may refer to:

Ernest Gasson (cricketer, born 1887) (1887–1962), New Zealand cricketer
Ernest Gasson (cricketer, born 1907) (1907–1942), New Zealand cricketer
George Gasson (born 1997), Welsh rugby union player
Helena Gasson (born 1994), New Zealand Olympic swimmer
Jacqui Gasson (1938–2020), British politician
Mark Gasson, British scientist at the University of Reading, UK
Richard Gasson (1842–1864), American soldier who fought in the American Civil War
Thomas I. Gasson (1859–1930), American Catholic priest and Jesuit

See also
Gasson Hall, building on the campus of Boston College in Chestnut Hill, Massachusetts
Gaston (disambiguation)